Road 47 is a 2013 drama film written and directed by Vicente Ferraz, based on real events, about Brazil's involvement in World War II. The film stars Daniel de Oliveira, Richard Sammel, Sergio Rubini and Julio Andrade.

The film follows the trajectory of men from the landmine clearance unit of the Brazilian Expeditionary Force who after a panic attack are trying to get tempers and defuse the mined road that separates them from a village monitored by enemy forces.

Plot

Background 
During World War II, Brazil became an ally of Soviet Union, United States, UK and Free France, among other Allies. In the second half of 1944, it sent to the Italian Campaign, in several stages, a military contingent formed mainly by an infantry division to fight the forces of Nazi Germany and Fascist Italy. Almost all these soldiers came from rural and poor backgrounds, and with no previous military experience, they had to learn in practice to fight for survival at the front.

Main Plot 
After suffering a collective panic in a non-specified point of Gothic Line, the soldiers Guimarães (Daniel de Oliveira), Piauí (Gaspar Francisco), Laurindo (Thogum) and their Lieutenant (Júlio Andrade), try to retreat of the site, but end up missing their company. So, they had to decide to return to their unit under risk of facing court-martial for dereliction of duty, or return to the position of night before at risk of facing a surprise attack by numerous forces of the enemy. That's when a war correspondent, Rui (Ivo Canelas), tells them about an active minefield and they think this is a chance to redeem the mistake they committed, but much is yet to happen and the war is far from over.

Cast 

Sergio Rubini as Roberto
Daniel de Oliveira as Guimarães 'Guima'
Thogun as Sergente Laurindo
Francisco Gaspar as Piauí
Júlio Andrade as Tenente Penha
Ivo Canelas as Rui
Richard Sammel as Colonnello Mayer
Daniele Grassetti as Partigiano
Giorgio Vicenzotti as Partigiano

Production 
In an interview, Vicente Ferraz said that he wanted to discuss Brazil's history in World War II, which he said was "forgotten by the Brazilians and which is completely unknown abroad."  He used diaries, letters, and interviews as source material.

Release 
Road 47 premiered at the 2013 Festival do Rio.

Reception 
Jonathan Holland of The Hollywood Reporter wrote, "Competent but not inspiring, this is a simple and effective film which never does full justice to the stirring material it’s based on."  Mark Adams of Screen International called it an "impressively mounted war film" and "high quality drama".

References

External links 

2010s Portuguese-language films
2010s Italian-language films
2010s German-language films
2013 independent films
Italian multilingual films
Brazilian multilingual films
Portuguese historical drama films
Italian historical drama films
Films set in the 1940s
Films shot in Italy
Films set in Italy
World War II films
Brazilian independent films
Brazilian historical drama films
Portuguese independent films
Italian independent films
2013 multilingual films
2013 films
Portuguese multilingual films
2010s historical drama films